A Chilean passport is an identity document issued to citizens of Chile to facilitate international travel. Chilean passports are valid for worldwide travel and facilitate the access to consular services whilst abroad. They are issued by the Registro Civil e Identificación.

Citizens of Chile do not need a passport when traveling to Argentina, Bolivia, Brazil, Colombia, Ecuador, Paraguay, Peru and Uruguay. For these countries, they may use just their National ID cards called Cédula de Identidad.

Chilean passports are valid for a period of 10 years (since 1 February 2020) from the date of issue, and the validity may not be extended. Since the introduction of machine-readable passports, family passports are no longer issued.

Since September 2013, new biometric passports are being issued. The redesign was part of a program organized by the Ministry of Justice, where Chileans chose the passport's graphic identity and symbols through an online poll in 2012.

Application process
All passports are issued exclusively by the Registro Civil e Identificación. Within Chile, passport applications are made in person at most offices of the Registro Civil e Identificación. For applicants outside Chile, applications are accepted by all Consulate Generals. A photograph and fingerprints of the applicant are taken on site, as well as a fingerprint of the right thumb if the applicant also requires an Identity Card, Cédula de Identidad.

Passports applications in Chile have a turn-around time of 7 labour days (but usually is not more than 3 labour days from photo capture to delivery) and must be picked up at the office where the application was made, unless the applicant requires the passport to be delivered for pick-up in Santiago or in another different office. The expected time of delivery for passport applications made outside Chile is of about 6 weeks, unless the applicant requires an expedite service for an additional cost (subject to availability).

Physical description
 2013–present edition
New regular biometric passports issued since September 2013 are burgundy red colored. The words República de Chile are above the coat of arms with the word Pasaporte and Passport below, followed by the biometric passport symbol. Both the letters and coat of arms are color gold. The standard passport has 32 pages, while the extended version has 64 for an additional fee. The data page contains a microchip with the biometric information of the holder. It features images of the Andes, the Andean Condor and the national flag. The passport is in Spanish and English.

 1992–2013 edition (still valid, until expiration dates in each passport)
Regular passports are deep navy blue. The words República de Chile are above the Chilean Coat of Arms, with the word Pasaporte below. The color of the coat of arms and the letters is copper. The standard passport contains 32 pages, but it can be issued with 64 pages for an additional fee. The data page is located in the back cover, therefore leaving all 32 pages for stamps and visas. The data page has several security features, such as the digitalized photograph and signature of the bearer, as coat of arms visible under ultraviolet light and a Moai printed with optically variable ink over the upper-left corner of the bearer's photograph.

Since 2003, only machine-readable passports with a digitalized photo of the passport holder are issued. The information page is written in Spanish and English.
 Photograph
 Type of Document (P for Passport, D for Diplomatic and O for Official)
 Country Code (CHL)
 Passport Number (same as RUN number (National ID) until 2013)
 Surname
 Given Names
 Nationality (Chilena)
 Booklet Number
 Date of Birth
 Issuing Authority (Registro Civil e Identificación)
 Gender
 Place of Birth (Name of city if born in Chile. For those born outside Chile, name of the city and the country)
 Issuing date
 Expiration date
 Signature

The information page ends with the machine-readable zone.

Fees

Passport applications for a passport outside Chile are similarly priced but paid in the local currency. The price is informed to the applicant by the consular office at the time of application and a US$3 consular fee is added. e.g. 

These costs may vary in accordance with rises determined annually by the Civil Registry & Identification Service.

Biometric passport
The Registro Civil e Identificación and the Ministry of Justice of Chile awarded the contract to manufacture new Chilean biometric passports and ID cards to France-based Morpho S.A.S (now IDEMIA) on January 20, 2012.  The new passport and ID card system was introduced to the general public on September 2, 2013. All documents issued from this date on will be biometric, and all non-biometric documents will be valid until their date of expiration.

Gallery of Chilean passports

The travel freedom of Chilean citizens

 Chilean citizens had visa-free or visa on arrival access to 174 countries and territories, ranking the Chilean passport 16th overall (tied with Monaco) in terms of travel freedom, the third strongest in the Americas (after the passports of the United States and Canada), and the strongest in Latin America, according to the Henley Passport Index.  The passports of Chile, Brunei and South Korea are the only ones to provide visa-free access to all G8 countries.

References

Ministerio de Relaciones Exteriores de Chile - Recomendacion para Chilenos que viajan al extranjero

Chile
Foreign relations of Chile
Government of Chile